Portland School of Art may refer to:

Maine
Maine College of Art, known as the Portland School of Art between 1972 and 1992

Oregon
Art Institute of Portland
Pacific Northwest College of Art, in Portland
Oregon College of Art and Craft, in Portland, Oregon
Portland Institute for Contemporary Art